William Procter Remington (March 13, 1879 - December 19, 1963) was an American track and field athlete who competed at the 1900 Summer Olympics in Paris, France. He was also a prelate of the Episcopal Church.

Early life and education
Remington was born on March 13, 1879, in Philadelphia, Pennsylvania, the son of Joseph Price Remington and Elizabeth Baily Collins. He is a descendant of John Remington, who emigrated from England to Salem, New Jersey. He was educated at the DeLancey School in Philadelphia and later graduated with a Bachelor of Science from the University of Pennsylvania in 1900. He then embarked on his athletic career. Later, he graduated with Bachelor of Divinity from Virginia Theological Seminary in 1905 and was later was awarded a Doctor of Divinity from the same institution in 1918.

Athletic career
Remington placed fourth in the long jump. His best jump in the qualifier was 6.725 metres, good for fourth place going into the final. He bettered this by 10 centimetres in the final, but remained in fourth place. Remington also competed in the 110 metre hurdles. He placed second in his first-round heat and second in his repechage heat, not qualifying for the final.  He also placed fourth in his semifinal heat of the 200 metre hurdles and did not qualify for the final in that event either.

Ordained Ministry
Remington was ordained deacon in 1905 and priest in 1906. He then served as assistant rector at [[Church of the Holy Trinity, Philadelphia
|Holy Trinity Church]] in Philadelphia between 1905 and 1907. He then became vicar of the Memorial Chapel of the Holy Communion in Philadelphia and during 1911 and 1918 served as rector of St. Paul's Church in Minneapolis. In the World war he served as chaplain of Base Hospital 26. He was elected Suffragan Bishop of South Dakota in 1917 and was consecrated on January 18, 1918. He was appointed as missionary Bishop of Eastern Oregon on September 20, 1922, and was installed November 19, 1923. He was later elected as Suffragan Bishop of Pennsylvania on June 26, 1945, and installed in November 1945. He retired in 1951 and died in 1963.

References

 De Wael, Herman. Herman's Full Olympians: "Athletics 1900". Accessed 18 March 2006.

External links 

Image at National Portrait Gallery

1879 births
1963 deaths
Athletes (track and field) at the 1900 Summer Olympics
Olympic track and field athletes of the United States
American male long jumpers
American male hurdlers
Episcopal Church in Oregon
Episcopal bishops of Pennsylvania
Episcopal bishops of South Dakota
Episcopal bishops of Eastern Oregon